Revaltoppe is one of the highest mountains in Queen Louise Land, NE Greenland. The peak is located in the King Frederick VIII Land area of northeastern Greenland. Administratively it is part of the Northeast Greenland National Park zone.

This peak was named after Reval, the historical name of Tallinn, the capital of Estonia, where according to a legend, the Dannebrog (flag of Denmark) is said to have dropped from the sky during a battle between the Danes and the Estonians in 1219.

Geography
Revaltoppe is the highest peak in a group of nunataks to the west of Dannebrogsfjeldene, at the southwestern end of Queen Louise Land. The nunatak group was named Reval Toppene or Revaltoppene by J.P. Koch’s 1912–13 Danish Expedition to Queen Louise Land.

Revaltoppe is a  peak. This mountain is marked as a  peak in the Defense Mapping Agency Greenland Navigation charts.

See also
Gefiontinde, Queen Louise Land's highest point
List of mountain peaks of Greenland
List of mountains in Greenland
List of Nunataks#Greenland

References

External links
Reval Toppen, Greenland - Peakbagger
Ice recession in Dronning Louise Land, north-east Greenland 

Revaltoppe